Akinori Nakagawa is the first studio album from Akinori Nakagawa.

Track listing

External links
Official Discography 
Jbook data 
[ Akinori Nakagawa] at Allmusic
Akinori Nakagawa at Billboard

2001 debut albums
Akinori Nakagawa albums